Janne Kuokkanen (born 25 May 1998) is a Finnish professional ice hockey forward for HC Fribourg-Gottéron of the National League (NL). Kuokkanen was drafted 43rd overall by the Carolina Hurricanes in the 2016 NHL Entry Draft.

Playing career
Before joining London Knights for the 2016–17 season, Kuokkanen played one game in his native Finland for Oulun Kärpät in the Finnish Liiga. He also played one game for their affiliate team Hokki in the Finnish 2nd level and 47 games for Kärpät in their U20 team. Approaching the post-season in his rookie season in North America with the London Knights of the Ontario Hockey League and having averaged over a point-per-game offensively with 26 goals and 62 points in 60 games, Kuokkanen was signed to a three-year entry-level contract with the Carolina Hurricanes on 24 March 2017. After a second round exit in the post-season with the Knights, Kuokkanen was assigned to join the Hurricanes AHL affiliate, the Charlotte Checkers, during their first round series against the Chicago Wolves. Kuokkanen made his North American professional debut appearing in a single game with the Checkers in their first round defeat.

Kuokkanen started the 2017–18 season with the Hurricanes but after playing four games and garnering no points he was reassigned to the Checkers on 30 October 2017.

During the 2019–20 season, while leading the Charlotte Checkers in scoring with 42 points through 52 games, Kuokkanen was dealt by the Hurricanes at the NHL trade deadline, along with Fredrik Claesson and a conditional 2020 fourth-round pick to the New Jersey Devils in exchange for Sami Vatanen on 24 February 2020. Kuokkanen scored his first NHL goal on 30 January 2021, in a 4–3 shootout loss to the Buffalo Sabres. On 9 August, Kuokkanen was re-signed to a two-year contract by the Devils.

On 13 July 2022, the Devils bought out the final year of Kuokkanen's contract. Leaving the NHL, he was later signed to a one-year contract with Swiss club, HC Fribourg-Gottéron of the National League (NL), on 27 July 2022.

Career statistics

Regular season and playoffs

International

Awards and honours

References

External links
 

1998 births
Living people
Binghamton Devils players
Carolina Hurricanes draft picks
Carolina Hurricanes players
Charlotte Checkers (2010–) players
Finnish ice hockey forwards
HC Fribourg-Gottéron players
Hokki players
London Knights players
New Jersey Devils players
Oulun Kärpät players
Sportspeople from Oulu